Ectoedemia albibimaculella is a moth of the family Nepticulidae. It is found from Fennoscandia to Italy.

The wingspan is 5–6 mm.

The larvae feed on Arctostaphylos uva-ursi. They mine the leaves of their host plant. The mine consists of a slender gallery that eventually enters a petiole, from where it enters a bud. The larva hibernates in the bud, that is eaten out in spring. Then the larva bores in a young shoot, sometimes diverting into a leaf that then is completely mined out. Pupation takes place in a dark yellow cocoon inside the mine.

External links
Fauna Europaea
bladmineerders.nl
Swedish Moths

Nepticulidae
Moths of Europe
Moths described in 1927